Internal Medicine, titled Zentralblatt innere Medizin or Innere Medizin in German, formerly titled Kongresszentralblatt für die gesamte Innere Medizin und ihre Grenzgebiete: Offizielles Organ der Deutschen Gesellschaft für Innere Medizin, was a German medical journal with a broad focus on internal medicine, published by Springer, as the official publication of the German Society of Internal Medicine. It was founded in 1912 and published until 1991. The last editions had the English and German titles as equivalent parallel titles.

References

Springer Science+Business Media academic journals
Internal medicine journals
Publications established in 1912
1912 establishments in Germany
Publications disestablished in 1991